The 2009–10 Nicaraguan Professional Baseball League season finished with the Leones del León winning the competition.

Standings

Final Series
Leones del León - Orientales de Granada 4-1 wins

Nicaraguan Professional Baseball League
Nicaraguan Professional Baseball League
Nicaraguan Professional Baseball League
B
B